Ime Bishop Umoh,  often called Okon Lagos , is an African actor and comedian.

Early life, education and career 

Ime Bishop is an Ibibio from Nsit Ibom, Akwa Ibom State in the southern part of Nigeria. He graduated from the University of Uyo where he studied Philosophy. 
He started his acting career since his childhood and he has featured in over 100 movies. The movie that brought him to the limelight was an indigenous movie, "Uyai", which was produced by Emem Isong in  2008. it was tough for him when he lost his mum.

Endorsement 
 He is a brand ambassador for GLO Nigeria.

Political appointment 
The comic actor in 2016 was appointed as a special assistant to the Governor of Akwa Ibom State, Udom Gabriel Emmanuel on Ethical and Social Reorientation.

Awards and nominations

Films 

On 1 May 2020, as the COVID-19 lockdowns in Nigeria was easing, Ime Bishop Umoh was featured in a comedy skit titled "The Pregnant Man" by Ofego on his YouTube channel using archive footage.

See also 
Mc Galaxy
Ini Edo

References

External links 

People from Akwa Ibom State
1981 births
Living people
Nigerian male film actors
21st-century Nigerian male actors
University of Uyo alumni
Nigerian male television actors
Nigerian actor-politicians
Actors from Akwa Ibom State
Nigerian comedians
Nigerian media personalities
Ibibio people
Nigerian film award winners